The Parliament of the United Kingdom currently has 650 parliamentary constituencies across the constituent countries (England, Scotland, Wales and Northern Ireland), each electing a single member of parliament (MP) to the House of Commons by the plurality (first past the post) voting system, ordinarily every five years. Voting last took place in all 650 of those constituencies at the United Kingdom general election on 12 December 2019.

The number of seats rose from 646 to 650 at the 2010 general election after proposals made by the boundary commissions for England, Wales and Northern Ireland (the Fifth Periodic Review of Westminster constituencies) were adopted through statutory instruments. Constituencies in Scotland remained unchanged, as the Boundary Commission for Scotland had completed a review just before the 2005 general election, which had resulted in a reduction of 13 seats.

Primary legislation provides for the independence of the boundary commissions for each of the four parts of the UK; the number of seats for each of the countries; permissible factors to use in departing from any old boundaries; and a strong duty to consult. The Fifth Review was governed by the Parliamentary Constituencies Act 1986. Under the Parliamentary Voting System and Constituencies Act 2011, as amended by the Parliamentary Constituencies Act 2020, the number of MPs is now fixed at 650. The Sainte-Laguë formula method is used to form groups of seats split between the four parts of the United Kingdom and the English regions (as defined by the NUTS 1 statistical regions of England).

Overview
The table below gives the number of eligible voters broken down by constituent country, including the average constituency size in each country.

Geographical size of constituencies 

As the number of electors in each constituency is similar, the constituencies themselves vary considerably in area, ranging from Ross, Skye and Lochaber, which occupies a sixth of Scotland, to the densely-populated London constituency of Islington North.

Parliamentary constituencies in the United Kingdom

The "Region" of the table refers to the NUTS 1 statistical region of England, which coincides with the former European Parliament constituency in which the constituency was included until 31 January 2020.

As of the 2019 election there are 533 constituencies in England, 40 in Wales, 59 in Scotland and 18 in Northern Ireland.

England

Scotland

Wales

Northern Ireland

Summary of main boundary changes for the 2010 general election
Scotland – No changes from 2005 election.
Wales – Number of seats unchanged: three seats were abolished and three were created: Aberconwy, Arfon, and Dwyfor Meirionnydd.
Northern Ireland – No extra or fewer seats allocated.
England:

The non-metropolitan counties of Cornwall, Derbyshire, Devon, Essex, Hampshire, Lancashire, Norfolk, Northamptonshire, Warwickshire and Wiltshire each gained one seat. 
Following the abolition of the county of Avon, each of the four successor authorities (Bristol, South Gloucestershire, Bath and North East Somerset, and North Somerset) were considered separately, resulting in significant changes, gaining one seat overall. 
The metropolitan counties of Greater Manchester, Merseyside, Tyne and Wear, South Yorkshire, West Midlands and West Yorkshire each lost a seat.
Inner London gained one seat while northern and eastern parts of Outer London each lost one.
The City of York was reviewed separately and was divided into two seats, neither overlapping part of North Yorkshire.
Herefordshire and Worcestershire, to reflect their full reinstatement as separate counties, were considered in separate reviews, leading to Herefordshire being split into two constituencies, each entirely within the county.
Isle of Wight maintained its status as one constituency, the largest by electorate.

Current boundary reviews
Following the abandonment of the Sixth Periodic Review (the 2018 review), the Boundary Commission for England formally launched the 2023 Review on 5 January 2021. It is due to be completed by July 2023.

See 2023 Periodic Review of Westminster constituencies for further details.

See also
List of former United Kingdom Parliament constituencies
Member of Parliament
Lists of electoral districts by nation
United Kingdom general elections overview

References

Bibliography
Boundary Commission for N.I. Fifth Periodical Report (HM Command Paper 73) – Parliamentary Constituencies of Northern Ireland. Retrieved 2013-07-19.

 
Politics of the United Kingdom
2010 United Kingdom general election
2015 United Kingdom general election
2017 United Kingdom general election